Lac de Lispach is a lake in the commune of La Bresse, Vosges department, France. At an elevation of 909 m in the Vosges mountains, its surface area is 0.12 km².

Lispach
Bogs of France